Kanalus Junction railway station is a  railway station on the Western Railway network in the state of Gujarat, India. Kanalus Junction railway station is 26 km from Jamnagar railway station. One Passenger and one Superfast train halt here.

Trains 

The following Superfast trains halt at the Kanalus Junction railway station in both directions:

 22945/46 Saurashtra Mail

See also
 Jamnagar district

References

Railway stations in Jamnagar district
Rajkot railway division
Railway junction stations in Gujarat